Jet Geyser is a geyser in the Lower Geyser Basin of Yellowstone National Park in the United States. Jet Geyser is in the Fountain Group that includes Fountain Geyser, Morning Geyser, Red Spouter and Silex Spring.

Jet Geyser is a very accessible and intimate geyser, being close to a park road and alongside a boardwalk.

Jet usually erupts in long-duration series.  During series, eruptions are relatively frequent and less than one minute in duration. Jet Geyser's behavior is influenced by nearby (and much bigger) Fountain Geyser. Jet eruptions usually occur every 7 to 30 minutes, with the frequency increasing as a Fountain Geyser eruption nears.  Jet erupts every 1 to 4 minutes during most Fountain Geyser eruptions.  After Fountain has quit, Jet usually quits.  Approximately mid-way through a Fountain Geyser interval, Jet often starts a new eruption series.

Jet is a cone-type geyser with at least five vents that erupt in different directions (vertical, angled, and subhorizontal). The vents produce varying quantities of water and steam for about 0.25 to 1 minute.

References

Geysers of Wyoming
Geothermal features of Teton County, Wyoming
Geothermal features of Yellowstone National Park
Geysers of Teton County, Wyoming